Stykkið is a village on the west coast of the Faroese island Streymoy in Kvívík Municipality.

The 2005 population was 42. Its postal code is FO 330. Stykkið was founded in 1845.

See also
List of towns in the Faroe Islands

External links
Danish site with photographs of Stykkið

Populated places in the Faroe Islands